Amanita hesleri or Hesler's lepidella is a species of Amanita from North Carolina and Tennessee to Mississippi and Texas, U.S.A.

References

External links
 
 

hesleri